Michamps Ulmodrome  was a recreational aerodrome located near Bastogne, Luxembourg, Belgium. As of 2015 it is no longer mentioned in the Belgian AIP, though aero-modelling is still happening at the field.

See also
List of airports in Belgium

References 

Defunct airports in Belgium
Bastogne